LeCrone is a surname. Notable people with the surname include:

 Emery LeCrone (born 1986), American dancer and choreographer
 Megan LeCrone, American ballet dancer